Alexandre Gomes (born July 24, 1982) is a Brazilian professional poker player. He is a World Series of Poker bracelet winner, a World Poker Tour champion and a former Team PokerStars Pro.

World Series of Poker 
Gomes became the first Brazilian World Series of Poker bracelet winner after defeating a field of 2,317 players in the 2008 World Series of Poker $2,000 No-Limit Hold'em event, earning $770,540.

World Series of Poker bracelets

World Poker Tour 
On July 20, 2009, Alexandre Gomes outlasted 267 players to win the Bellagio Cup V, taking home $1,187,670 and a WPT title.

European Poker Tour 

At the European Poker Tour's PokerStars Caribbean Adventure, Gomes made the final table as chip leader with over 8 million in tournament chips after doubling through the former chip leader Kevin Saul. at the final table played on January 10, 2009, he finished in fourth place earning $750,000. In his last hand, Gomes held  and made a fullhouse on a board of  but lost when he ran against the quad jacks of Benny Spindler who held the fourth jack, holding .

As of 2012, his total live tournament winnings exceed $3,400,000.

References

External links 
 PokerStars profile

Brazilian poker players
World Series of Poker bracelet winners
World Poker Tour winners
People from Curitiba
1982 births
Living people